The Argobba are an ethnic group inhabiting Ethiopia. A Muslim community, they are spread out through isolated village networks and towns in the northeastern and eastern parts of the country. Group members have typically been astute traders and merchants, and have adjusted to the economic trends in their area. These factors have led to a decline in usage of the Argobba language. Argobba are considered endangered today due to exogamy and destitution.

History
According to scholars, the Kingdom of Aksum's army moved south beyond Angot, encountering a nomadic people named Gebal in eastern Shewa, who are supposedly the precursors to Argobba. Gebal would develop into settlers of Hararghe known as Argobba after their conversion to Islam and having significant ties to the Muslim world, dominated trade in Zeila and Harar. Modern Argobba claim they originate from the Arabian Peninsula through Zeila in what is now Somaliland and first settled in the Harar plateau. They were involved in launching the first Islamic state known in East Africa, the Sultanate of Shewa in Hararghe, sometime in the ninth century.

In the 13th century, Argobba created the ruling Walashma dynasty, which would become leaders of the Sultanate of Ifat and Adal Sultanate.

The Argobba and the Harla people seem to have relied on each other in the Islamic period. A power struggle erupted between the Abadir dynasty of Harari and the Walashma dynasty of Argobba throughout the Islamic period until Ahmad ibn Ibrahim al-Ghazi took control of Adal Sultanate by executing the Walashma sultan Abu Bakr ibn Muhammad in the 16th century.

In the late sixteenth century, Argobba were involved in several conflicts with the Oromo during the Oromo migrations, and due to the withdrawal of Adal from Ethiopia, came partially under Ethiopian Empire rule losing land rights. Many Argobba were forcibly baptized in Shewa by Menelik II.

In the nineteenth century, Emperor Yohannes IV ordered the forced displacement of Argobba for refusing to convert to Christianity. Due to expansions from two dominant ethnic groups, many Argobba speak either Amharic or Oromo in Wollo Province; however, those who self-identify as originally Argobba are substantial in the region. The last remaining villages of a once larger Argobba-speaking territory are Šonke and Ṭollaḥa.

Under the new government of Ethiopia, the Ethiopian People's Revolutionary Democratic Front, ushered in the early 90s the Argobba obtained regional political power after launching Argoba Nationality Democratic Organization.

Distribution
Argobba communities can be found in the Afar, Harari, Amhara, and Oromia Regions, in and along the Great Rift Valley. They include Yimlawo, Gusa, Shonke, Berehet, Khayr Amba, Melka Jilo, Aliyu Amba, Metehara, Shewa Robit, and the surrounding rural villages.

Religion
Argobba are exclusive adherents to the Muslim faith. They are also widely believed to be the first to accept Islam collectively, in the Horn of Africa and vanguards for early Islamic expansion. The Shonke Argobba reportedly forbid their children from attending school due to the possible unislamic influence it might have on them.

Language
The Argobba traditionally speak Argobba, an Ethiopian Semitic language within the Afroasiatic language family. According to Getahun Amare, Argobba is not a dialect of Amharic as previous linguists believed, but a separate language. Argobba language evolved from proto Amharic and Argobba. In other areas, the people have shifted to neighboring languages for economic reasons. At this time there are only a few areas left where the Argobba are not at least bilingual in Amharic, Oromo or Afar.

See also
 Argobba special woreda in the Afar Regon
 Argobba special woreda in the Amhara Regon
 Argoba Nationality Democratic Organization

References

External links
 Aklilu Asfaw, "A short History of the Argobba", Annales d'Éthiopie, 16 (2000), pp. 173–183.

Further reading
 Abebe Kifleyesus, Tradition and Transformation: The Argobba of Ethiopia. Wiesbaden: Harrassowitz Verlag, 2006. 
 Richard Wilding, The Arla, the Argobba and Links between the Coast and the Highlands. A Preliminary Archeological Survey. Addis Ababa University, Faculty of Arts, 1975

Habesha peoples
Ethnic groups in Ethiopia